Rasha Elsayed  (born ) is a retired Egyptian female volleyball player, who played as a libero. She was part of the Egypt women's national volleyball team at the 2002 FIVB Volleyball Women's World Championship in Germany. On club level she played with Zamalek SC.

Clubs
 Zamalek SC (2002)

References

1981 births
Living people
Egyptian women's volleyball players
Place of birth missing (living people)